Brave Festival – Against Cultural Exile is an annual Polish music festival launched in 2005 by Song of the Goat Theatre Association. It takes place in Wroclaw, as well as in other cities in Lower Silesia. Since inception, artists from all over the world have been invited to present their musical/cultural traditions. The festival is intended as an opportunity for attendees to speak about where they come from, their values, their traditions and their spirituality. It aims to save and protect forgotten, abandoned and forlorn cultures. Brave Festival also has a project called Brave Kids, which aims is to introduce, integrate and start a collaboration of artistic groups of childs from different continents. Grzegorz Bral is the director of Brave Festival.

In 2011 Brave Festival was included in the official list of The Cultural Programme of the Polish EU Presidency 2011 in the category “Cylic cultural events and festivals organized by local and non-governmental institutions.” The following groups help to support the festival: President of the City of Wroclaw - Rafal Dutkiewicz, UNESCO, Marshal of the dolnośląskie voivodeship - Rafał Jurkowlaniec and the Ministry of Culture and National Heritage.

Idea of Brave Festival 
Since now there were ten editions of festival: The Magic of Voice (2005), Voices of Asia (2006), Drowned Songs (2007), The Ritual starts it Africa (2008), Prayers of the world (2009), Enchanters (2010), The Mask (2011), Women Initiating (2012), Lost Rhythm (2013), Sacred Body (2014), Griot (2015) and Outcasts (2016). Each edition presents concerts, theatre, performances, rituals, prayers and art of the people, tribes, groups or individuals from all over the world.

During the festival people, who don't agree on exile from their own traditions and sensitivity, share  their culture.  Brave Festival tries to support them by concerts, exhibitions, workshops (dance, musical and handicraft ones) and film program. All those events allow a public to see and experience what maybe couldn't be known in other way.

Festival places were among others: theatres in Wroclaw (Teatr Polski, Wrocławski Teatr Współczesny, Teatr Pieśń Kozła), cinemas (Dolnośląskie Centrum Filmowe), galleries (Galeria BWA Design, ArtBrut) and other cultural places (The White Stork Synagogue, the Impart Art Center, Opera Wroclawska, Wytwórnia Filmów Fabulranych). There were also outdoor events.

Brave Festival hosted artists and groups from China, Japan, Korea, Taiwan, Singapore, Russia, Australia, Egypt, Georgia, Bulgaria, India, Mali, Tanzania, Burkina Faso, Chile, USA, Ukraine, Uganda, Kyrgyz Republic, Mongolia, Niger, Azerbaijan, Pakistan, Poland, Corse, Rumania, Israel, Sardinia, Macedonia, Marocco, Grance and other countries.

Revenue from festival ticket sales are designated to support humanitarian activities in Tibet led by the international charity organization, ROKPA.

Festival Main Program

2018 

The thirteenth edition of Brave Festival took place on July 13–22, 2018 and was organized under the slogan "Visible-Invisible", which revealed a number of unique, often difficult to reach to a wider audience, artistic phenomena. The eleven invited artists or creative groups share a decidedly social character and the fact that they all use art - primarily music and theater - not as entertainment and decoration, but as a tool to influence social change and stagnant reality, and as a weapon against injustice and exclusion.

2017 
The festival for 2017 was cancelled due to lack of funding.

2016 
12th edition of the festival took place between 1st and 16 July 2016 and was organized under the title "Outcasts - Wykluczeni". It was a significant and symbolic edition, because in 2016 more than any in other year so far it dealt specifically with "exile". Organizers decided to discuss people who have always been different in their own communities or in foreign ones, for which they have been stigmatized. "Outcasts - Wykluczeni" was host to a number of events from across the world showing people whose everyday lives are, for a variety of reasons, very difficult and complicated. Brave Festival showed people who used art to change or even utilize their exclusion.

2015 

11th edition of the festival titled "Griot " took place between 10th and 17 July 2015. In the cultures of West Africa, griots are guardians of tradition, bards, poets, singers, storytellers and musicians, who for ages have had a great significance for the culture mainly from the area of today's Gambia, Mali, Senegal, Burkina Faso, Liberia and Mauretania. Their stories are tightly connected with sounds and rhythm. For centuries, the function of a griot has been reserved exclusively for men born in one of a few clans, where this honourable role was passed on from generation to generation, from a father to a son. The undeniable role, which they play in creating the African culture, especially today, in the times of sudden civilisation changes, when keeping and protection of own heritage are becoming more and more difficult – makes griots ideally align with the mission of Brave Festival. Among invited artists there were: Kassé Mady Diabaté (Mali), Abou Diarra (Mali), Zanzibar Taarab/Kidumbak Ensemble (Zanzibar) czy Coumbane Ely Mint Warakane (Mauritania).

2014 

10th edition of Brave Festival titled „Sacred Body ” took place between 4th and 17 July 2014. The festival's program focused on the theatre, dance and ritual – all of them come from artistic traditions in which the body, the leitmotif, is shown either in a literal or in a symbolic way. Among others were Rama Vaidyanathan – mistress of classical Indian dance Bharata Natjam, Melanie Lomoff – French dancer with ballet education and Koffi Kôkô – voodoo priest and a representative of contemporary African dance. This year's Brave Festival main program was also accompanied by Film Program divided into three theme sections: Brave People Doc, Brave Contexts and Brave Focus, devoted to India. The Festival's opening film was ‘The Light of Asia’ by Franz Osten from 1925 featuring live music – an original score composed and performed by the Divana Ensemble from Rajasthan.

2013 

Brave Festival – Against Cultural Exile, 9th edition titled "Lost Rhythm" took place between 7th and 12 July 2013 in Wroclaw. The program of the 9th edition of Brave Festival, as each year, consisted of performances, concerts, film screenings, exhibitions, workshops and open forum meetings. During six days many extraordinary artists from all over the world presented a number of authentic and little known rituals, ceremonies, sacred songs and other artistic traditions from Asia, Africa, South Africa and Europe. Among others invited were representatives of various distant cultures  (dancers, singers and actors) whose artistic activity circles around rhythm and its meaning. The audience then had a chance to take part in the “One” – performance of Korean group “Cheong-bae” which presented the Yeon-hee style: a combination of ritual, shamanistic music, dance and acrobatics. Among others was Addal, group of women from the Berber people performing the addal dance, a unique form of ahouach and Rotal Drummers of Burundi. This year's Brave Festival main program was accompanied also by a series of meetings under a banner of Brave Meetings . During this year's Brave Festival, the audience had the opportunity to get to know members of the guest performers in Wroclaw. In addition to the above, 19 film images were screened as part of Brave Festival film program and each of them referred to this-year theme – the rhythm – in more or less obvious way. Also, the fourth edition of Brave Kids took place 25.06-13.07.2013 in Wroclaw, Puszczykowo, Warsaw, Lodz and Krosnice. gathered 114 kids and leaders from following countries: India, Uganda, Zimbabwe, China, Georgia, Israel, Czech Republic, Laos, Iran, Kyrgyzstan and Poland.

2012 

Between 2nd and 7 July 2012 the 8th edition of Brave Festival – festival against cultural exile – one of the most unusual initiatives in Europe, held again in Wroclaw (Poland). 2012 year's edition was entitled „Women Initiating”. The program included projects presented by women from around the world. Brave Festival is a unique event, as apart from revealing to the audience the secrets of vanishing cultures, it also provides help to others. 100% of the proceeds from ticket sales are donated each year to ROKPA International, an organization that supports children in Nepal, Tibet and African countries. 2012 year's edition saw among others the prenuptial tradition of unyago, presented by Bi Kidude – a one hundred-years’ old drummer from Zanzibar; the voices of the elderly ladies from the Meninas de Sinhá group from Brazil, showed how one can face the adversities of life with the help of singing and playing music; while the descendants of the Tuareg people, whom the members of Tartit group from Mali are drawn from, proved that the blues derives from Africa.

2011 

7th edition took place from 2nd till 8 July 2011 under the title "Mask". The title mask, instead of covering and hiding, brings closer the rich culture of various parts of the world, among others Bali, Sri Lanka, Furkina Faso or Sardinia. In 2011 the audience had a chance to meet the authentic culture, forgotten traditions, mysterious rituals and the art of the most remote regions of our globe. The indigenous artists and representatives of dying cultures have arrived to the capital city of Lower Silesia; cultures which can be searched for, in vain, during other festivals and on the omniscient Internet. The festival audience had the unique chance to see the representative of the Sardinian carnival – Mamuthones, dancers from Bali, the traditional Hindu drama – Kathakali, or Blind Note – a show by musicians performing, in complete darkness, on traditional, local instruments. Furthermore, the main events were accompanied by a series of documentaries, the Brave Kids project, exhibitions, meetings with the artists and workshops.

2010 

The 6th edition of Brave Festival was called “Enchanters” and aimed to focus on the presentation a wide range of traditions in which word has a significant meaning, not being only a sound or an information carrier, traditions that recognize the energy of word and pay a great attention to its poetic, power of expression, melody and rhythm. Invited by organizers to Wroclaw came the solo artists and groups from all over the world, among others: Korean mistress of ancient art pansori – Ahn Sook-Sun, Bi Kidude – 100 years old diva of taraab music from Zanzibar, Bulgarian group Bistritsa performing Balkan polyphonies and Sekouba Traoré, Malian master of donso n'goni.

2009 

The fifth edition of Brave Festival was entitled “Prayers of the World”. The festival took place not only in Wroclaw, but also in other cities of Lower Silesia, namely Olesnica, Wolow, Swidnica and Klodzko. During the event artists and genuine representatives of traditional cultures performed original songs, rituals and ceremonies connected with prayers and observances still practiced in many religions of different cultural regions of the world, from, among others, Asia, Africa and Europe. The audience had the chance to take part in the rituals performed by a Korean shaman, Tibetan monks or Theyyam dancers.

2008 

The fourth edition of Brave Festival was entitled “The Ritual Starts in Africa”. The work of both African artists and others which was presented during this edition enabled spectators to witness new, unknown qualities of the continent and allowed them to discover the core of African culture – the ritual. The festival gave spectators the chance to learn about unique practices, to meet people from culturally distant regions and to learn about various artistic forms of "the dying world". The schedule of the festival consisted of, among other steve.

nts, performances of dancers and musicians of the Fula tribe from Niger, performances by the women of the Tanzanian Wagogo tribe and many concerts, film showings, workshops, meetings and discussions with invited guests.

2007 

The third edition of the festival was entitled “Drowned Songs”. The organizers presented not only songs, performances and films, but also the context and sources from which they came. The artists from faraway corners of the world presented, here in Wroclaw, the Berber trans songs of Morocco, the Ukrainian "songs of the marshes", the refined, ancient polyphonies of Caucasus, the polyphonic dialogs of Belgorod, the mystical songs of Sardinia and "shoulder dances" of black Jews from Ethiopia.

2006 

„Voices of Asia” was the theme of the second edition of the festival. During this edition the traditions of Laos, Japan, Sri Lanka, Singapore, Taiwan, South Korea and Siberia were presented. In total 13 bands and 99 artists participated. There were performances, concerts and workshops of traditional dancing and singing. A series of Asian films which were accompanied by film workshops devoted to creating intercontinental documentary films and to the way films are shot. The audience were also able to attend lectures and meetings with festival guests.

2005 

The first edition of Brave Festival was entitled "The Magic of Voice". It explored the subject of voice – broadly understood – through performances built around songs and through concerts and workshops devoted to various vocal techniques, and to learning how to play traditional instruments mostly from the former Soviet Republics. During the festival, which lasted four days, there were presented, among others, the Siberian ugadan kurduk, singing from Tuva, the music of Svans, Khakassian singing with quarter-tones and semitones, the music of the Sufi tradition, the liturgical songs of monks from Atos, traditional Ukrainian songs, the music of Ancient Greece and African stories.

Brave Kids 

A part of Brave Festival is a project called Brave Kids, which consists of  3-weeks workshops for artistic groups of kids. Those kids come from regions deeply affected by natural disasters, political conflicts, homelessness or poverty. An educative programof Brave Kids has a clear priority in the center of which is a good and care of young person.

The pilot edition of Brave Kids took place in Wroclaw in 2009. Organizers have invited children from Nepal and Uganda to participate in a two-week long artistic workshops, which culminated in a final performance prepared together with children from one of Wroclaw's day-shelters. The workshop were implemented by Grzegorz Bral, Abraham Tekya and Leya Wyler.

First official edition of Brave Kids happened between 25 June 2010 and  09th of July 2010. Artistic groups of kids from  6 different regions of the world, influenced by tragic experiences of historical, social and natural disasters came to Wroclaw to create a performance together. Kids from Zimbabwe, Rwanda, Nepal, Sweden  Chechnya, Ingushetia and Poland  during 2 weeks of workshops were exchanging  artistic skills and show their talents. Apart of learning how to deal with cultural and language barrier young artists found out the new ways to build a mutual understanding among each other. 55 participants including children, youth, artistic leaders were working towards international dialogue and got most out of this cultural exchange.

To profound a multicultural dialogue kids were accommodated with 22 host families from Wroclaw. The culmination of the project was a common performance of 55 participants within the final concert of Brave Kids in the Impart Art Center.

References

External links

 Official website of the Brave Festival
 Official website of the Rokpa International
 Official website of the Song of The Goat Theatre Association
 Official website of Brave Kids

Music festivals established in 2005
Folk festivals in Poland
Summer events in Poland